Francis Grover Cleveland (July 18, 1903  – November 8, 1995) was an American politician, stage actor, director and producer. He was the co-founder of the Barnstormers Theatre, a theatre company in Tamworth, New Hampshire. His parents were President Grover Cleveland and First Lady Frances Folsom.

Early life
Cleveland was born in 1903 in Buzzards Bay, Massachusetts, a part of the Town of Bourne. His father, Grover Cleveland, was the 22nd and 24th president of the United States; his mother, Frances Folsom, was First Lady. He had a brother, Richard, and three sisters, Ruth, Marion and Esther

Cleveland was educated at the Phillips Exeter Academy and Harvard College.

Career

Cleveland became a stage actor in New York City. He played in Dead End by Sidney Kingsley and Our Town by Thornton Wilder on Broadway.

With his wife Alice, and his producer Edward P. Goodnow, Cleveland co-founded the Barnstormers Theatre, a theatre company in Tamworth, New Hampshire in 1931. He directed many plays for the company.

He was elected to serve on the board of selectmen of Tamworth, New Hampshire in 1950.

Personal life and death
Cleveland married Alice Erdman in 1925. They resided in Tamworth, New Hampshire. They had a daughter, Marion C. Cohen, who lived in Baltimore. Cleveland was predeceased by his wife in 1992.

Cleveland died on November 8, 1995, in Wolfeboro, New Hampshire, at age 92.

References

1903 births
1995 deaths
People from Barnstable County, Massachusetts
People from Tamworth, New Hampshire
Phillips Exeter Academy alumni
Harvard College alumni
American male stage actors
American theatre directors
American theatre managers and producers
New Hampshire Republicans
Grover Cleveland family